Epischnia yangtseella is a species of snout moth in the genus Epischnia. It was described by Aristide Caradja in 1939. It is found in China.

References

Moths described in 1939
Phycitini
Taxa named by Aristide Caradja